The Chancery House in St. Cloud, Minnesota, United States, is the current chancery for the Roman Catholic Diocese of St. Cloud and the former residence for the Bishop of St. Cloud.  It was built in 1916 for Bishop Joseph Francis Busch.  The Chancery House was an early work of Louis Pinault, St. Cloud's most prominent early-20th-century architect.  He employed Renaissance Revival style, with a mansard roof that gives the house a strong French character.  The building was listed on the National Register of Historic Places as the Bishop's House/Chancery Office in 1982 for its local significance in the theme of architecture.  It was nominated for being one of Pinault's best designs and a prominent member of St. Cloud's housing stock.

See also

 National Register of Historic Places listings in Stearns County, Minnesota

References

1916 establishments in Minnesota
Buildings and structures in St. Cloud, Minnesota
Clergy houses in the United States
Houses completed in 1916
Houses in Stearns County, Minnesota
Houses on the National Register of Historic Places in Minnesota
National Register of Historic Places in Stearns County, Minnesota
Properties of religious function on the National Register of Historic Places in Minnesota
Renaissance Revival architecture in Minnesota
Roman Catholic Diocese of Saint Cloud